Alexander Thomson (January 12, 1788 – August 2, 1848) was a member of the U.S. House of Representatives from Pennsylvania in the mid-1820s, judge, and law professor. He opened a law school in Chambersburg, that became the law department of Marshall College.

Early life and education
Alexander Thomson was born at Scotland, Franklin County, Pennsylvania, both of his parents died young. His father was Archibald Thomson, who served during the Revolutionary War, and died December 1801. His mother was Ann Thomson, who died after 1801. Alexander was the grandson of immigrant Alexander Thomson who arrived from Scotland in 1771 and settled with his wife and 12 children near Chambersburg, Pennsylvania.

Thomson was the eldest of six children. His siblings were James, Elizabeth, Jane, Agnes, and Hannah. When he was 15, he was apprenticed as a sickle maker with his uncle, Andrew Thomson. He was a self-taught scholar of Latin and Greek languages. He was hired by Reverend Isaac Grier to be a tutor at his classical school in the Cumberland Valley. While there, he also furthered his education. After three years, he moved to Bedford, where he taught languages at the Bedford Classical Academy.

Career
He studied law under Judge James Riddle in Bedford, was admitted to the bar in 1816, and commenced practice in Chambersburg, Pennsylvania. He held several local offices and was a member of the Pennsylvania House of Representatives in 1823.

In 1824, Thomson was elected to the Eighteenth Congress to fill the vacancy caused by the resignation of John Tod.  He was reelected to the Nineteenth Congress and served until May 1, 1826, when he resigned. He was immediately commissioned assistant judge of the District Court of the City and County of Lancaster, and the Counties of York and Dauphin. He was commissioned president judge of the Sixteenth Judicial District, composed of Franklin, Bedford and Somerset Counties, on June 25, 1827 and served until 1841.

Thomson moved to Chambersberg where he purchased a mansion that was used as his residence, offices for his private practices, and a law school. His instruction consisted of oral instructions and examinations. His school became the law department of Marshall College.

Personal life
Thomson was married on October 21, 1817 to Abigail Blythe of Bedford. After Abigal's death, he married Jane Graham, a daughter of General Graham of Stoystown. He had two daughters and five sons, one of whom was the railroad executive Frank Thomson.

He died in Chambersburg in 1848. Interment in Falling Spring Presbyterian Cemetery.

Sources

Members of the Pennsylvania House of Representatives
Pennsylvania lawyers
Pennsylvania state court judges
Politicians from Lancaster, Pennsylvania
People from Franklin County, Pennsylvania
1788 births
1848 deaths
Democratic-Republican Party members of the United States House of Representatives from Pennsylvania
Jacksonian members of the United States House of Representatives from Pennsylvania
19th-century American politicians